Celia Geraldy (Buenos Aires, Argentina, ? – Buenos Aires, 1977) was an Argentine vedette actress in film and theater. She was a femme fatale at the beginning of Argentina's golden decade of cinema.

Filmography 
 
 Confesión (1940)
 Eclipse de sol (1943) 
 Pasión imposible (1943)
 La piel de zapa (1943)
 Los dos rivales (1944)
 La danza de la fortuna (1944)
 La casta Susana (1944)
 Mujeres que bailan (1949)
 Yo no elegí mi vida (1949)
 Arrabalera (1950)
 Los Pérez García (1950)
 Cinco grandes y una chica (1950)
 Abuso de confianza (1950)
 El zorro pierde el pelo (1950)
 Escándalo nocturno (1951)
 Deshonra (1952)
 Vigilantes y ladrones (1952)
 Trompada 45 (1953) 
 Uéi Paesano (1953) 
 Un hombre cualquiera (1954) 
 El Calavera (1954) 
 Un novio para Laura (1955)
 Sangre y acero (1956)
 El jefe (1958) 
 Yo quiero vivir contigo (1960)
 Bajo un mismo rostro (1962) 
 Alias Flequillo (1963) 
 Sombras en el cielo (1964)
 El gordo Villanueva (1964)
 Necesito una madre (1966)
 Una máscara para Ana (1966)

External links

 Celia Geraldy at Cinenacional

1977 deaths
Argentine vedettes
Argentine film actresses
Argentine stage actresses
Actresses from Buenos Aires
20th-century Argentine actresses